Senotainia caffra is a species of satellite flies (insects in the family Sarcophagidae).

Distribution
South Africa.

References

Sarcophagidae
Insects described in 1846
Diptera of Africa